Kupava is a rural locality (a selo) in Mirnoye Rural Settlement, Novonikolayevsky District, Volgograd Oblast, Russia. The population was 182 as of 2010. There are 5 streets.

Geography 
Kupava is located in steppe, on the Khopyorsko-Buzulukskaya Plain, on the bank of the Kupava River, 46 km northeast of Novonikolayevsky (the district's administrative centre) by road. Krasnoarmeysky is the nearest rural locality.

References 

Rural localities in Novonikolayevsky District